The Hindoostane Coffee House, opened at 34 George Street, London in 1810, was an Indian restaurant, and the first of its kind in the British Isles. It was founded by Sake Dean Mahomed, a former captain in the British East India Company's Bombay Army. It closed in 1812, when Mahomed became bankrupt. 

Its location is marked by a City of Westminster plaque, erected in September 2005.

See also 

 List of Indian restaurants

Notes

References

External links 
 

1810 establishments in England
1811 disestablishments in England
Asian-British culture in London
British companies disestablished in 1812
British companies established in 1810
British Indian history
Coffeehouses and cafés in London
Defunct Indian restaurants
Defunct restaurants in London
Indian restaurants in London
Restaurants disestablished in 1812
Restaurants established in 1810